Centre for Equity and Inclusion (CEQUIN), is a non-governmental organisation based in New Delhi India, that promotes the equal rights of women and girls, to lead a violence-free life, develop their abilities, own and manage their resources, as well as participate and be included in decision-making processes.

Organisation
Sara Abdullah Pilot, a social worker, co-founded CEQUIN with Lora Krishnamurthi Prabhu in 2009.

CEQUIN conducted research and advocacy on gender-based violence in public spaces in 2010, leading to the organizing of a National Level Conference in partnership with NCW and UNDP on the issue, followed by the publication of the book “The Fear that Stalks” by Zubaan Books in 2012. Many of the recommendations flagged by CEQUIN were incorporated in the Justice Verma Committee Report and the Criminal Law Amendment Act. CEQUIN was selected as one of the NGOs to run the Awaz Uthao Campaign pilot project by the Govt of NCT Delhi.

CEQUIN partnered with an NGO UMEED in 2014 to give deprived women in India electric rickshaw as a way to increase their potential for economic opportunity.

References

External links

Organisations based in Delhi
Women's organisations based in India
Women's rights in India
2009 establishments in Delhi